Congriscus megastomus is an eel in the family Congridae (conger/garden eels). It was described by Albert Günther in 1877, originally under the genus Congromuraena. It is a marine, temperate-water dwelling eel which is known from Japan and the Kyushu–Palau Ridge, in the northwestern Pacific Ocean. It inhabits reefs. Males can reach a maximum total length of 40 centimeters. This species' remarkably large and distinct leptocephalus larvae were previously known under the name Thalassenchelys coheni. In 2016, scientists used genetic techniques to link the larvae to the adult C. megastomus.

Congriscus megastomus is preyed on by Chlorophthalmus albatrossis. Its own diet includes finfish such as Diaphus coeruleus, Diaphus sagamiensis, Hymenocephalus lethonemus, Synagrops japonicus, and species of Macrura, as well as euphausiid plankton crustaceans and polychaetes.

References

Congridae
Fish described in 1877
Taxa named by Albert Günther